Audrey Sylvain (born 26 June 1984) is a French singer and dancer, originally from Avignon. Her first band was Amesoeurs. She also sang on Alcest's debut album. She was a full-time member in Peste Noire until her departure in 2016. In 2019 Audrey Sylvain released Incandescente — the debut EP of her solo project Malenuit.

Discography

With Amesoeurs
 Ruines Humaines - EP, 2006
 Valfunde/Amesoeurs - Split album, 2007
 Amesoeurs - Full-length, 2009

With Peste Noire
Folkfuck Folie album - 2007
Ballade cuntre lo Anemi francor album - 2009
L'Ordure à l'état Pur album - 2011
Peste Noire album - 2013
La Chaise-Dyable album - 2015

Guest Vocals for Alcest
Souvenirs d'un autre monde - 2007

Guest Vocals for Horns Emerging
Spleen 2012
Guest Vocals for Germ
Audrey appears on the songs Butterfly and Blue as the Sky, Powerful as the Waves from the 2013 album Grief Malenuit (Solo Project) Incandescente'' - EP, 2019

Notes and references 

1984 births
Living people
French musicians